Araeosoma belli is a species of sea urchin of the family Echinothuriidae. Their armour is covered with spines. It is placed in the genus Araeosoma and is found throughout the Caribbean Sea as well as areas around the Gulf of Mexico. Araeosoma belli was first scientifically described in 1903 by Ole Theodor Jensen Mortensen, a Danish zoologist.

See also 
 Araeolampas atlantica
 Araeosoma alternatum
 Araeosoma coriacea

References

External links
 http://www.marinespecies.org/aphia.php?p=taxdetails&id=422485

belli
Animals described in 1903
Taxa named by Ole Theodor Jensen Mortensen